Yangming Mountain may refer to:

 Yangming Mountains, located in Yongzhou, Hunan, series of mountains in Nanling Range
 Yangmingshan National Forest Park, located in the Yangming Mountains, a national forest park in Shuangpai County, Hunan
 Yangmingshan, one of the nine national parks in Taiwan